Yutian is a county in the northeast of Hebei province, China, and is under the administration of the prefecture-level city of Tangshan, bordering Tianjin to the north and west.

Administrative divisions
The county administers 14 towns and 6 townships.

Climate

References

External links

County-level divisions of Hebei
Tangshan